This is a list of members of the European Parliament for France in the 2014 to 2019 session.

List

References 
French Members of the European Parliament of 2014, Politiquemania.

Official 'Members of European Parliament'

2009
France
List